The men's team épée was one of ten fencing events on the fencing at the 1996 Summer Olympics programme. It was the twentieth appearance of the event. The competition was held on July 23, 1996. 33 fencers from 11 nations competed.

Draw

Finals

Rosters

Canada - 9th place
 Jean-Marc Chouinard
 Danek Nowosielski
 James Ransom

Estonia - 5th place
 Kaido Kaaberma
 Andrus Kajak
 Meelis Loit

France 
 Jean-Michel Henry
 Éric Srecki
 Robert Leroux

Germany - 4th place
 Elmar Borrmann
 Arnd Schmitt
 Marius Strzalka

Hungary - 6th place
 Géza Imre
 Iván Kovács
 Krisztián Kulcsár

Italy 
 Sandro Cuomo
 Angelo Mazzoni
 Maurizio Randazzo

Romania - 11th place
 Aurel Bratu
 Gheorghe Epurescu
 Gabriel Pantelimon

Russia 
 Aleksandr Beketov
 Pavel Kolobkov
 Valery Zakharevich

South Korea - 10th place
 Jang Tae-Seok
 Lee Sang-Gi
 Yang Noe-Seong

Spain - 7th place
 Oscar Fernández
 César González
 Raúl Maroto

United States - 8th place
 Tamir Bloom
 Jim Carpenter
 Mike Marx

References

Epee team
Men's events at the 1996 Summer Olympics